The men's 4×100 m freestyle relay at the 2009 World Aquatics Championships took place on 26 July 2009 at the Foro Italico in Rome, Italy.

Records
Prior to this competition, the existing world and competition records were as follows:

The following records were established during the competition:

Results

Heats

Final

External links
Preliminary Results
Final Results

Freestyle Relay Men 4x100